Darja Viďmanová (born 9 January 2003) is a Czech junior tennis player.

Born in Moscow, she moved with her family to the Czech Republic at the age of 5, eventually obtaining Czech citizenship.

Viďmanová has a career-high singles ranking by the Women's Tennis Association (WTA) of 755. 

She made her WTA Tour main-draw debut at the 2020 Prague Open, having received a wildcard for the doubles tournament, partnering Linda Fruhvirtová.

ITF finals

Singles: 2 (2 runner–ups)

Doubles: 2 (1 title, 1 runner–up)

References

2003 births
Living people
Czech female tennis players
Tennis players from Moscow
Russian emigrants to the Czech Republic